The Sicso is a right tributary of the river Apa Mare in Romania. It discharges into the Apa Mare in Vinga.

References

Rivers of Romania
Rivers of Timiș County